Logically is a British multinational technology startup company that specializes in analyzing and fighting disinformation. Logically was founded in 2017 and is based in Brighouse, England, with offices in London, Mysore, Bangalore, and Virginia.

The company is known for its software, which utilizes artificial intelligence to label textual or visual media as real or fake. Logically also publishes editorials and fact checks.

History 
Lyric Jain, an Ivy League graduate, founded Logically in 2017. According to Jain, he was partly inspired after the death of his grandmother from pancreatic cancer. Before her death, she joined a WhatsApp group that spread misinformation, leading her to replace "her cancer medication in favour of unproven, alternative treatments." Another motivator was the spread of misinformation in Britain around the time of the Brexit referendum, splitting entire communities.

An MIT grant helped launch the company. Logically first operated solely from Britain, employing 30 British residents by 2019. In early 2019, the company expanded to India, recruiting 40 employees who perform the majority of the company's fact-checking. In its 2019 seed round, Logically raised $7 million. In 2020, €2.77 million were raised, with backing by the Northern Powerhouse Investment Fund and XTX Ventures. As of 2020, Logically has 100 employees.

In June 2020, the International Fact Checking Network certified Logically as a fact-checker. The certification was renewed in September 2021 and January 2023.

Fact checks 
Logically assisted The Guardian in publishing a fact check of false claims by an English pastor connecting 5G technology to vaccination tracking. On August 13, 2020, the company released a Google Chrome extension that helps user check the credibility of articles, claims, and comments they read, with the extension working on hundreds of thousands of sites. In March 2021, Logically launched its Intelligence platform to governments as well as NGOs; the company claims that the platform can categorize different sets of disinformation narratives as they are being woven. Logically is one of many partners that TikTok works with to curtail disinformation on the social network. The New Yorker noted its tracking of disinformation related to healthcare and the COVID-19 pandemic. The BBC has cited Logically's research in tracking the rise of pro-Russian accounts linking Ukraine to Nazi ideology following the 2022 Russian invasion of the country.

In August 2020, Logically launched a browser extension to help users check the credibility of online articles and fact-check claims. The extension was discontinued in June 2022.

References

External links 
 

Companies based in West Yorkshire
2017 establishments in the United Kingdom
Fact-checking websites